The 2023 Dallas Wings season will be the franchise's 26th season in the Women's National Basketball Association and the 8th season for the franchise in Dallas - after relocating from Tulsa and Detroit. This will be the first season under head coach Latricia Trammell.

On September 19, 2022, the Wings announced that they would not renew the contract of head coach Vickie Johnson effectively firing her. On November 7, 2022, the Wings announced that Trammell would be the new head coach for the organization.

Transactions

WNBA Draft

Transactions

Roster Changes

Additions

Subtractions

Roster

Schedule

Regular Season

|- 
| 1
| May 20
| Atlanta
| 
| 
| 
| 
| College Park Center
| 
|- 
| 2
| May 26
| @ Seattle
| 
| 
| 
| 
| Climate Pledge Arena
| 
|- 
| 3
| May 28
| @ Chicago
| 
| 
| 
| 
| Wintrust Arena
| 
|- 
| 4
| May 30
| Minnesota
| 
| 
| 
| 
| College Park Center
| 

|- 
| 5
| June 2
| @ Washington
| 
| 
| 
| 
| Entertainment and Sports Arena
| 
|- 
| 6
| June 4
| @ Connecticut
| 
| 
| 
| 
| Mohegan Sun Arena
| 
|- 
| 7
| June 7
| Phoenix
| 
| 
| 
| 
| College Park Center
| 
|- 
| 8
| June 9
| Phoenix
| 
| 
| 
| 
| College Park Center
| 
|- 
| 9
| June 11
| @ New York
| 
| 
| 
| 
| Barclays Center
| 
|- 
| 10
| June 14
| Los Angeles
| 
| 
| 
| 
| College Park Center
| 
|- 
| 11
| June 17
| Seattle
| 
| 
| 
| 
| College Park Center
| 
|- 
| 12
| June 20
| Atlanta
| 
| 
| 
| 
| College Park Center
| 
|- 
| 13
| June 23
| @ Los Angeles
| 
| 
| 
| 
| Crypto.com Arena
|
|- 
| 14
| June 25
| @ Los Angeles
| 
| 
| 
| 
| Crypto.com Arena
| 
|- 
| 15
| June 27
| @ Phoenix
| 
| 
| 
| 
| Footprint Center
| 

|- 
| 16
| July 2
| Washington
| 
| 
| 
| 
| College Park Center
| 
|- 
| 17
| July 5
| @ Las Vegas
| 
| 
| 
| 
| Michelob Ultra Arena
|
|- 
| 18
| July 7
| Las Vegas
| 
| 
| 
| 
| College Park Center
| 
|- 
| 19
| July 9
| @ Indiana
| 
| 
| 
| 
| Gainbridge Fieldhouse
|
|- 
| 20
| July 12
| @ Minnesota
| 
| 
| 
| 
| Target Center
|
|- 
| 21
| July 19
| @ New York
| 
| 
| 
| 
| Barclays Center
|
|- 
| 22
| July 22
| Los Angeles
| 
| 
| 
| 
| College Park Center
|
|- 
| 23
| July 25
| Connecticut
| 
| 
| 
| 
| College Park Center
|
|- 
| 24
| July 28
| Washington
| 
| 
| 
| 
| College Park Center
|
|- 
| 25
| July 30
| @ Las Vegas
| 
| 
| 
| 
| Michelob Ultra Arena
|

|- 
| 26
| August 2
| @ Seattle
| 
| 
| 
| 
| Climate Pledge Arena
|
|- 
| 27
| August 4
| Chicago
| 
| 
| 
| 
| College Park Center
|
|- 
| 28
| August 6
| Chicago
| 
| 
| 
| 
| College Park Center
|
|- 
| 29
| August 8
| Las Vegas
| 
| 
| 
| 
| College Park Center
|
|- 
| 30
| August 12
| Connecticut
| 
| 
| 
| 
| College Park Center
|
|- 
| 31
| August 18
| @ Connecticut
| 
| 
| 
| 
| Gateway Center Arena
|
|- 
| 32
| August 20
| @ Washington
| 
| 
| 
| 
| Entertainment and Sports Arena
|
|- 
| 33
| August 22
| @ Minnesota
| 
| 
| 
| 
| Target Center
|
|- 
| 34
| August 24
| Minnesota
| 
| 
| 
| 
| College Park Center
|
|- 
| 35
| August 27
| @ Phoenix
| 
| 
| 
| 
| Footprint Center
|

|- 
| 36
| September 1
| @ Indiana
| 
| 
| 
| 
| Gainbridge Fieldhouse
|
|- 
| 37
| September 3
| Indiana
| 
| 
| 
| 
| College Park Center
|
|- 
| 38
| September 5
| New York
| 
| 
| 
| 
| College Park Center
|
|- 
| 39
| September 8
| Seattle
| 
| 
| 
| 
| College Park Center
|
|- 
| 40
| September 10
| @ Atlanta
| 
| 
| 
| 
| Gateway Center Arena
|
|-

Standings

Statistics

Regular Season

Awards and Honors

References

External links 
 Official website of the Dallas Wings

Dallas Wings
Dallas Wings seasons
Dallas Wings